Stefan Filipović (Serbian Cyrillic: Стефан Филиповић) (born January 18, 1987) is a Montenegrin pop singer.

Biography
Filipović was born in Titograd, now Podgorica, and studied in the Cetinje Music Academy. He started singing at age seven and he took part in various festivals in Montenegro and abroad. On January 27, he won MontenegroSong 2008, hence gaining the right to represent Montenegro in the Eurovision Song Contest 2008, that was held in Belgrade, Serbia. The song performed was chosen internally by a 30-member jury appointed by RTCG. The winning song was titled "Zauvijek volim te" (I love you for eternity), and was made by a team of Macedonian musicians - Grigor Koprov (author), Ognen Nedelkovski (composer) and Vladimir Dojčinovski (arranger), the same trio that created the Macedonian entry in 2007 - Mojot Svet. An English version of the song was also recorded, under the title "Never forget that I love you". The song's demo version was presented on Saturday, March 8 and was rearranged until March 15.  Filipović performed the song at the first semi-final of the competition, but failed to reach the final having only received 23 points placing him 14th in a pool of 19.

Singles
 Zujalica (Naša Radost - kids' festival, Podgorica)
 Đede Pero što je ovo (Naša Radost 1999)
 Deca imaju pravo (UNICEF kids festival, Tivat)
 Ringeringe raja (Naša Radost)
 Ja Mogao Bih Sve (Music Festival Budva 2005 - 4th place & Best Debutant Award)
 Ne Umijem (Sunflower Music Festival in Zrenjanin 2005 - 3rd place & Best Debutant Award)
 Za Nju (Evropesma 2006 - 4th place)
 Šećer i Voće (Music Festival Budva 2006 - 2nd place)
 Ne Mogu Bez Tebe (MontenegroSong 2007 - 2nd place)
 Nebo i More (Music Festival Budva 2007 - 1st place)
 Zauvijek Volim Te / Never Forget That I Love You (Eurovision Song Contest 2008)

External links
The Njegoskij Fund Network : "Montenegrin public voted: Stefan Filipovic to Belgrade in May".
The Njegoskij Fund Network : "Stefan Filipovic’s Eurovision 2008 song finally revealed!".
The Njegoskij Fund Network : "Stefan Filipovic’s Eurovision 2008 song presented in English version" (final version with lyrics).
Grigor Koprov composing a song for Stefan (in Macedonian)

1987 births
Living people
Musicians from Podgorica
21st-century Montenegrin male singers
Eurovision Song Contest entrants for Montenegro
Eurovision Song Contest entrants of 2008